The William Cather Homestead Site, in Webster County, Nebraska near Red Cloud, Nebraska, was listed on the National Register of Historic Places in 1982.

The property includes the site of William Cather's homestead and the remains of housing of a pump.

References

National Register of Historic Places in Webster County, Nebraska